Ralph Assheton, 1st Baron Clitheroe,  (24 February 1901 – 18 September 1984), was an English aristocrat and politician.

Biography
Assheton was born on 24 February 1901. His father was Sir Ralph Assheton, 1st Baronet (1860–1955), and his mother, Mildred Estelle Sybella Master (1884–1949). He was educated at Summer Fields School and Eton College.

Assheton was Member of Parliament (MP) for Rushcliffe from 1934 to 1945, for the City of London from 1945 to 1950, and for Blackburn West from 1950 to 1955. In the wartime government under Winston Churchill, he was Minister of Supply in 1942, and Financial Secretary to the Treasury from 1942 to 1944. He was sworn of the Privy Council in the 1944 New Year Honours, and served as Chairman of the Conservative Party from 1944 to 1946.

After retiring from the House of Commons at the 1955 general election, he was raised to the peerage as Baron Clitheroe, of Downham in the County Palatine of Lancaster, on 21 June 1955. He succeeded his father as 2nd Baronet on 21 September 1955. He was appointed to be a Deputy Lieutenant of Lancashire on 16 November 1955, and later served as Lord Lieutenant of Lancashire, from 1971 to 1976. He was appointed a Knight of the Most Venerable Order of the Hospital of St. John of Jerusalem (KStJ) in February 1972, and appointed to the Royal Victorian Order as a Knight Commander in 1977 on his retirement from the Council of the Duchy of Lancaster.

Family
He married Hon. Sylvia Benita Frances Hotham, daughter of Frederick William Hotham, 6th Baron Hotham (1863–1923), on 24 January 1924. They had four children:

 Anne Assheton (born & died 22 December 1924)
 Hon. Bridget Assheton (born 20 August 1926, died 22 May 2004).  Married Sir Marcus Worsley, Bt, brother of Katharine, Duchess of Kent
 Ralph John Assheton, 2nd Baron Clitheroe (born 3 November 1929)
 Hon. Nicholas Assheton, CVO (born 23 May 1934, died 27 November 2012)  Treasurer to Queen Elizabeth The Queen Mother from 1998 to her death in 2002.

Lord Clitheroe died in 1984.

References

External links 
 

1901 births
1984 deaths
People educated at Summer Fields School
People educated at Eton College
Chairmen of the Conservative Party (UK)
Assheton, Ralph
Deputy Lieutenants of Lancashire
English justices of the peace
Knights Commander of the Royal Victorian Order
Lord-Lieutenants of Lancashire
Assheton, Ralphe
Members of the Privy Council of the United Kingdom
Ministers in the Chamberlain wartime government, 1939–1940
Ministers in the Churchill wartime government, 1940–1945
Hereditary barons created by Elizabeth II
Politicians awarded knighthoods
Assheton, Ralph
Assheton, Ralph
Assheton, Ralph
Assheton, Ralph
Assheton, Ralph
UK MPs who were granted peerages
Hulme Trust